Erik van Rossum (born 27 March 1963, in Nijmegen) is a former Dutch football player.

He runs a pub in Nijmegen.

Club statistics

References

External links

Neil Brown

1963 births
Living people
Dutch footballers
Association football central defenders
Plymouth Argyle F.C. players
English Football League players
NEC Nijmegen players
FC Twente players
Willem II (football club) players
Eredivisie players
Belgian Pro League players
J1 League players
Tokyo Verdy players
Expatriate footballers in Belgium
Expatriate footballers in England
Expatriate footballers in Japan
Dutch expatriate footballers
Dutch expatriate sportspeople in Japan
Footballers from Nijmegen
Dutch expatriate sportspeople in England
Dutch expatriate sportspeople in Belgium